Bohnen may refer to:

People with the surname
Blythe Bohnen (born 1940), American artist.
Michael Bohnen (1887–1965), German opera singer and actor.
Roman Bohnen (1901–1949), American actor.

Other
Birnen, Bohnen und Speck, a German dish.